Elbląg Canal is a canal in Poland, in Warmian-Masurian Voivodeship,  in length, which runs southward from Lake Drużno (connected by the river Elbląg to the Vistula Lagoon), to the river Drwęca and lake Jeziorak. It can accommodate small vessels up to  displacement. The difference in water levels approaches , and is overcome using locks and a system of inclined planes between lakes.

Today it is used mainly for recreational purposes. It is considered one of the most significant monuments related to the history of technology and was named one of the Seven Wonders of Poland. The canal was also named one of Poland's official national Historic Monuments (Pomnik historii), as designated January 28, 2011. Its listing is maintained by the National Heritage Board of Poland.

History
The canal was designed between 1825 and 1844 by Georg Steenke, carrying out the commission given by the King of Prussia. Construction began in 1844. The difference in height over a  section of the route between the lakes was too great for building traditional locks; an ingenious system of inclined planes based on those used on the Morris Canal was employed instead, though the canal includes a few locks as well. There were originally four inclined planes, with a fifth added later, replacing five wooden locks. Built under the name Oberländischer Kanal (Upland Canal) and situated in the Kingdom of Prussia, it was opened on the 29 October 1860. Since 1945 the canal is now in Poland. After wartime damage was repaired, it was restored to operation in 1948 and is now used for tourism.

The canal underwent renovation between 2011 and 2015 and is now again open to navigation.

The inclined planes

It was built to replace five wooden locks close to Elbląg. They were constructed from 1860 to 1880.

The canal worked independently of other waterways and as a result the boats were designed within the limits of the inclines.

Boats are carried on carriages that run on these rails. The inclines rise from the lower level of the canal to a summit and then down a second shorter incline to the upper canal level. The first part of the main incline and the short upper incline were both built at a gradient of 1:24 (4.2%). A carriage is lowered down the incline to counterbalance an upward moving carriage. Once the downward moving carriage has reached the summit and started down the main incline its weight helps pull up the upward moving carriage. This allowed the slope of the incline for this section to be built at a steeper gradient of 1:12 (8.3%).

See also
 Augustów Canal, linking the river Vistula with the river Neman
 Big Chute Marine Railway also carries boats in an open carriage instead of a water filled caisson.
 Boat lift
 Ship lift of Krasnoyarsk hydroelectric power station

References

Further reading

External links

Official webpage
An Overland Canal Some old photos of the lift from 1937
Photo gallery of the canal
A trip on the Elbląg Canal described by Michael Palin

Canals opened in 1860
Boat lifts
Canal inclined planes
Canals in Poland
Buildings and structures in Elbląg
Tourist attractions in Warmian-Masurian Voivodeship
3000 mm gauge railways